The Republican Party of Liberty (PRL) was a centre-right to right-wing French political party founded after the Liberation of France on 22 December 1945 by Joseph Laniel, André Mutter, Édouard Frédéric-Dupont and Jules Ramarony. It was the only significant right-wing conservative political party in the late 1940s. Key elements in this program were enacted, including the exclusion of the Communist Party from power, closer relations with the United States, and amnesty for Marshal Philippe Pétain's supporters. It was absorbed by the National Centre of Independents and Peasants (CNI) in 1951.

The PRL's aim was to unite French conservatives, who had been totally discredited in 1944 due to the numbers of Vichy collaborators in their ranks, and the role they played during the interwar period. Bernard Frank mocked "this right which suddenly discovered in itself a love for the Republic and liberty." The PRL's tentative approach failed, most conservative leaders trying to conserve their autonomy or to recreate parties of the Third Republic such as the Democratic Alliance, the Republican Federation or the Republican Social Party of French Reconciliation (Parti républicain social de la réconciliation française).

The PRL campaigned for a "no" vote in the May 1946 referendum on the Constitution. It obtained 38 seats in the November 1946 legislative elections. The party was presided over by Michel Clemenceau (son of Georges), who obtained 60 votes out of 883 during the 1947 presidential election — under the Fourth Republic, the President was elected by members of the two chambers of Parliament, not by universal suffrage.

The PRL then obtained 11 Senators in the indirect elections for the Council of the Republic of 1948. After numerous internal dissensions, the PRL merged into the CNI in 1951, while some members joined the Gaullist Rally of the French People.

Members 
Michel Clemenceau, President.
Robert Bertolaud
Édouard Barrachin
Henry Bergasse
François Brigneau
Robert Bruyneel
Jean Crouzier
Édouard Frédéric-Dupont
Henri Giraud
Louis Jacquinot
Pierre July
Joseph Laniel
Joseph Lecacheux
Jean Legendre
Pierre Montel
André Mutter
Georges Pernot
Jules Ramarony
Paul Reynaud

Further reading 
 Vinen, Richard. "The Parti Républicain de la Liberté and the Reconstruction of French Conservatism, 1944–1951." French History (1993) 7#2 pp: 183–204.

References 

Right-wing parties in France
Political parties established in 1945
Political parties disestablished in 1951
1945 establishments in France
1951 disestablishments in France
Opportunist Republicans